Robert Eugene Daniels (July 20, 1935 – March 18, 2022) was an American basketball player and coach. Collegiately he played basketball and baseball for  Western Kentucky University under Hall of Fame coach Edgar Diddle. In 1957 he was drafted by the Cincinnati Royals. He started assistant coaching under Coach Guy R. Strong at Kentucky Wesleyan College and was a part of the 1965–66 National Championship team, the first of Kentucky Wesleyan's eight National Championships. During the late 1960s and early-1970s he coached the Kentucky Wesleyan Panthers for five seasons, all five seasons he took the team to the Division II NCAA Tournament and won the second and third National Championship for the college. After Kentucky Wesleyan he was the Thundering Herd coach beginning in the 1972–73 season for the NIT appearance.

Daniels died in Versailles, Kentucky, on March 18, 2022, at the age of 86.

Head coaching record

References

External links
 

1935 births
2022 deaths
American men's basketball coaches
American men's basketball players
Baseball players from Kentucky
Basketball coaches from Kentucky
Basketball players from Kentucky
Cincinnati Royals draft picks
Forwards (basketball)
Grand Forks Chiefs players
High school basketball coaches in Kentucky
Kentucky Wesleyan Panthers men's basketball coaches
Las Vegas Wranglers (baseball) players
Marshall Thundering Herd men's basketball coaches
People from Johnson County, Kentucky
Salem Rebels players
San Jose Pirates players
Western Kentucky Hilltoppers baseball players
Western Kentucky Hilltoppers basketball players
Wilson Tobs players